Chant Down Babylon: The Island Anthology is a compilation album by Burning Spear. It was released by Island Records in 1996.

Track listing

Disc one
"Marcus Garvey" (Winston Rodney, Phillip Fullwood)
"Slavery Days" (Rodney, Fullwood)
"I & I Survive" (Rodney, Fullwood)
"Old Marcus Garvey" (Rodney, Fullwood)
"Tradition" (Rodney, Delroy Hines, Rupert Willington)
"The Invasion (A.K.A. Black Wa-Da-Da)" (Rodney, C. Paisley, Fullwood)
"Door Peep" (Rodney)
"No More War" (Rodney)
"Black Soul" (Rodney)
"Man In The Hills" (Rodney)
"Cultivation" (Rodney)
"The Sun" (Rodney, Fullwood, Don Taylor)
"It's A Long Way Around" (Rodney, Fullwood)
"Throw Down Your Arms" (Rodney)
"Dry & Heavy" (Rodney)
"Black Disciples" (Rodney)
"The Lion" (live) (Rodney)
"Jordan River" (live) (Rodney, M. Lawrence, Fullwood)
"Jah No Dead" (Rodney)

Disc two
"Marcus Children Suffer" (Rodney)
"Social Living" (Rodney)
"Marcus Say Jah No Dead" (Rodney)
"Nyah Keith" (Rodney)
"Civilize Reggae" (Rodney)
"Mek We Dweet" (Rodney)
"My Roots" (Rodney)
"Recall Some Great Men" (Rodney)
"Great Men's Dub" (Rodney)
"One People" (Rodney)
"African Women" (Rodney)
"Jah Kingdom" (Rodney)
"Praise H.I.M." (Rodney)
"Should I" (Rodney)
"Estimated Prophet" (Robert Weir, John Perry Barlow)
"Thank You" (Rodney)

Credits
Compilation produced by Jerry Rappaport
Executive producers Bill Levenson and Trevor Wyatt
Digitally mastered by Joseph M. Palmaccio, PolyGram Studios
Additional mastering by Suha Gur, PolyGram Studios
Essay by Amy Wachtel
Package design by Aldo Sampieri
Photographers: David Corio (front cover), Chris Carroll, Adrian Boot, Dennis Morris
Project coordination by Terry Tierney
Project assistance by Catherine Ladis
Special thanks: Chris Blackwell, Hooman Majd, Jon Baker, Pat Monaco, Holly Ferguson, Harry Weinger, Pattie Chirico and the staff at the Polygram Studios and the staff at Island Studios, London.

References

1996 compilation albums
Burning Spear compilation albums
Island Records compilation albums